Sant'Agostino is a Roman Catholic church located in the center of the old town of Morrovalle, province of Macerata, in the region of Marche, Italy.

History
The name of the church and the adjacent Augustinian convent imply that the present structures were likely preceded by older, Romanesque or Gothic, buildings. The present brick church, in a subdued Baroque-style dates to the 17th century. It faces, at an angle, the main square (Piazza Vittorio Emanuele) in the town with a tall bell tower with clock and city hall to the left. The two story façade has a rectangular second story window and flanking brick giant pilasters lacking decoration. The portal has the only decoration in the façade with a white stone triangular pediment with a coat of arms and a semicircular steps.

The interior has a single rectangular nave illuminated by large windows. The present church was restored after severe damage during World War II. The interiors contain:
 Madonna delle Grazie (14th-century) derived from a former neighboring Franciscan church.
 Contemplation attributed to a follower of Federigo Barocci.
 Crucifix (circa 1500).
 Organ over the entrance portal.

References

17th-century Roman Catholic church buildings in Italy
Baroque architecture in Marche
Morrovalle
Morrovalle